Koasati (also Coushatta) is a Native American language of Muskogean origin.  The language is spoken by the Coushatta people, most of whom live in Allen Parish north of the town of Elton, Louisiana, though a smaller number share a reservation near Livingston, Texas, with the Alabama people. In 1991, linguist Geoffrey Kimball estimated the number of speakers of the language at around 400 people, of whom approximately 350 live in Louisiana.  The exact number of current speakers is unclear, but Coushatta Tribe officials claim that most tribe members over 20 speak Koasati. In 2007, the Coushatta Tribe of Louisiana, in collaboration with McNeese State University and the College of William and Mary, began the Koasati (Coushatta) Language Project as a part of broader language revitalization efforts with National Science Foundation grant money under the Documenting Endangered Languages program.

Koasati is most closely related to the Alabama language but, though the Coushatta and Alabama have historically lived near each other, their  languages are no longer mutually intelligible without extensive exposure. The language is also related to the Mikasuki language; some native speakers of Coushatta report they can understand Mikasuki without previous exposure to the language.

Phonology

Vowels
Koasati has three vowels, all of which occur as short and long and can be nasalized. The following chart is based on Kimball's work. Kimball describes what is normally the close-mid back vowel /o/ as "high back" vowel, hence its placement in the chart below. He notes that /o/ sometimes has the allophone [u] and is raised to [ʊ] in closed word-final syllables.

In 2007, the Coushatta Tribe of Louisiana developed and approved its own orthographic system. In this system, long vowels are written by doubling the vowel (e.g., [aː] as aa), and nasalized vowels are underlined (e.g., [õ] or [ǫ] as o).

Vowel length in Koasati can be contrastive. For example, vowel length distinguishes meaning for palana "bean" and palaana "plate", as well as choba "big" and chooba "horse". Vowel nasalization most often occurs word-finally as a phrase-terminal marker. In Koasati, the end of a phrase is basically marked by either deletion of the final unaccented vowel or the nasalization of the final vowel when deleting it would eliminate phonological information relevant to the phrase's meaning. For example, the final vowel in hopoonilaho "he/she will cook it" is nasalized instead of deleted, and therefore is distinguished from the more emphatic hopoonilaha, where the irrealis future suffix -laha- indicates that the action will certainly occur, whereas the irrealis future suffix -laho- does not provide such certainty.

Consonants
Koasati has the consonants given in the table below, based on Geoffrey Kimball's work. IPA transcriptions occur in brackets when different from the orthography provided by Kimball.

Not included in this chart is a glottal glide (marked :) that Kimball uses in his own consonant chart, presumably to represent the lengthened vowel sounds of Koasati. However, the website for the Koasati Language Project explicitly states that these consonants are never aspirated. The  occurs most often before , as in  "river", spelled  in the official orthography, thereby distinguished from  "tail".

Syllable structure
Koasati has both light (CV, VC, V) and heavy (CVC) syllables. Consonant clusters occur across syllables but not within. All monomorphemic Koasati words end in light syllables, while the penultimate syllable can be light but is usually heavy, and it is usually preceded by one or more light syllables, as with the construction CV.CVC.CV as in the word holihtá "fence". Other shapes, in which one or more heavy syllables precede a heavy penultimate syllable (e.g. CV.CVC.CVC.CV as in hacokpalpá "butterfly"), or alternate heavy and light syllables (e.g. CVC.CV.CVC.CV. as in pa:piyá:ka "bridge"), are usually the result of the compounding of two words or a once-productive rule of syncope in which the vowel of every second syllable except the final syllable was deleted. Vowel clusters occur in Koasati, unlike in other Muskogean languages where such clusters are made impossible by metathesis and vowel deletion. These clusters occur in Koasati due to the use of locative prefixes that end in a vowel and class 1A negative transitive verbs since these do not undergo the processes of metathesis and vowel deletion. Clusters beginning with /a:/ and /i:/ are most frequent, and all clusters are generally spoken with a glottal stop between vowels.

Tone
Koasati has low [ ` ], high [ ´ ], and high rising–falling [ ˇ ] pitch accents, as well as a fourth unmarked mid-level tone. All noun roots must have one high-pitch accented syllable. The location of the accent depends on the properties of the penultimate syllable. With a few exceptions, the accent falls on the final syllable unless the penultimate syllable contains a long vowel. These pitch accents can be contrastive, as with sakihpǫ́ 'It is a mink.' and sakíhpǫ 'It is not air-dried.'. Pitch placement on verbs is motivated by morphology. Most indicative verbs take the high accent, though a few take the low accent. Intensive verbs take the high rising–falling accent.

Phonological processes
/c/ in Kimball's orthography, or /ch/ in the official Tribe orthography, is sometimes realized as [ts] before resonants: cf. awó yáhci "it is just like grandpa" is realized as [awó yahtsi].
In rare cases, /k/ is labialized to [kʷ] before /o/: cf. akkó "that" → [akkʷó]
/s/ has the palatal allophone [š] word-initially before /o/ and intervocalically: cf. sopátlit "she cleaned it" → [šopátlit]
When /s/ occurs both before and after a vowel, the allophone of the first /s/ harmonizes with that of the second. For example, sóslit ('he skinned them') is not pronounced [šoslit] but [sóslit].
Rarely, /s/ can have the allophone [r] when it occurs word-finally: cf. o:támmo:s "it is just sunset" → [o:támmo:r]
In the word-final position, /h/ becomes a voiceless continuation of the vowel it follows. This can also occur following vowels in other positions. For example, iltóhnot "she worked" becomes [iltóónot].
/h/ can be voiced to [ɦ], usually before c, as discussed above with [haɦchi].
/l/ is sometimes realized as /n/, as with intolihná "work" → [iltolihná]. Rarely, it is realized as [r] intervocalically.
The vowel /i/ shifts to [ɪ] in all closed syllables, and /o/ shifts to [ʊ] when it occurs in closed word-final syllables: cf. hókfit "she put it on" → [hókfɪt]; íkbot "he did not kill it" → [íkbʊt]
The vowels /i/ and /o/ also rarely have the allophones [ɛ] and [u] respectively, though the underlying reason is unclear: cf. yilahá "orange (fruit)" → [yɛlahá]; solitá:wa "soldier" → [sulitá:wa]

Morphology
Koasati is a polysynthetic language with fairly extensive verbal prefixing and suffixing.

Nouns
Two sets of prefixes mark noun possession in Koasati. The am-set generally identifies alienable possession and a relatively small set of kinship terms and body parts, while the ca-set identifies inalienable possession and most kinship terms and body parts. These prefixes mark person and number on possessing nouns as follows:

Verbs

Position classes
Kimball identifies the following position classes for prefixes and suffixes that can be added to Koasati verb roots:
Prefixes
Position 1: positive and negative subject prefixes
Position 2: locative prefix a-, or the prefix ak- which indicates action on the surface of a person (skin) or thing
Position 3: locative prefixes
Position 4: pronominal prefixes (ca-)
Position 5: pronominal prefixes (am-)
Position 6: distributive prefix ho-/oh-, iterative prefix hoho-/ohoh-
Position 7: instrumental prefixes
Position 8: directional prefixes
Position 9: indefinite nouns naːsi-/naːs-/nas- ('something') and aːti-/aːt-/at-/a- ('someone')
Root
Suffixes
Position 1: adverb
Position 2: diminutive/intensive
Position 3: habitual
Position 4: intention
Position 5: ability
Position 6: realis/irrealis
Position 7: deduction
Position 8: modality
Position 9: dubiative
Position 10: hearsay
Position 11: auditory
Position 12: tense
Position 13: consequence
Position 14: discourse functions
Position 15: enclitics

Prefixes
Unlike its frequently used cognates in other Muskogean languages, the general locative prefix a- (Position 2) is falling out of use. Positions 4 and 5 relate to the am- and ca- sets discussed above with nouns. They contain the direct and indirect object prefixes respectively and are used to cross-reference the direct and indirect objects of verbs, as well as mark possession on nominalized verbs. For example, the Position 5 prefix ac- is used to mark possession on the root of the nominalized verb meaning "to photograph" in the following way:

A sampling of verbal prefixes, in this case, specific locative prefixes of Position 3, follows:
itta- "action on the ground; action in fire"
o:-/o:w- "action in water"
pa:- "action on a raised, artificial, or non-ground surface"
on- "action on a vertical surface or in a vertical plane"
itta- "action in the middle of something"
ibi:- "action on the human face"
ico:- "action on or in the human mouth"
no:- "action on the human neck"
nok- "action in the human throat"

Suffixes
Kimball recorded over seventy suffixes to fill the fifteen suffix positions. All but eleven of these suffixes can technically co-occur with all other suffixes that do not occupy the same position class. Kimball provides the following example as a possibility:

In the first word, all units that follow the root -ilá- "arrive" are suffixes filling the various position classes.

A sample of suffixes, in this case, Position 5 suffixes of ability, follows:
-bá:no- "regularly, occasionally"
-bí:no- "reluctantly, shyly"
-halpi:sa- "to be able to"
-yáhli- "be obliged to, really"

Kimball notes that of these, only -halpi:sa- "to be able to" is used frequently.

Verbal number
Muskogean languages such as Koasati have a three-way number distinction in their verbs, with singular, dual, and plural forms.  Some of these forms are suppletive. For example,

'To dwell', in the first person, with full suppletion (singular aat, dual asw, plural is):  
{|
|áata-l|| ||asw|| ||ís-tílka
|-
|dwell()-1|| ||dwell()()|| ||dwell()-1
|-
|'I dwell'|| ||'we two dwell'|| ||'we all dwell'
|}
(The angle braces, separate the two parts of the root.)

'To smell' is non-suppletive hofn:
{|
|hófna-l|| ||hofn
|-
|smell-1|| ||smell()
|-
|'I smell'|| ||'we smell'
|}
'To go about', partially suppletive ( aay,  yomahl):
{|
|aaya-l|| ||aiy|| ||yomah-híl
|-
|go.about()-1|| ||go.about()()|| ||go.about()-1
|-
|'I go about'|| ||'we two go about'|| ||'we-all go about'
|}
'To run', partially suppletive ( waliik,  tołk): 
{|
|walíika-l|| ||tół-hílk
|-
|run()-1|| ||run()-1
|-
|'I run'|| ||'we run'
|}

Verb grades
Like other Muskogean languages, Koasati has verb grades, or an ablaut system in which morphological and phonemic changes (in this case infixation and nasalization) can be used to alter the meaning of verb.

H-grade
In Koasati, the h-grade is used to create a polite imperative as well as to indicate a sequence of actions. To form the imperative, h is inserted before the final syllable of the verb root. For example, the verb óntin "to come" (singular, dual subject) changes to the imperative ónhtįh "Come on over!" with the h-grade (in addition to the delayed imperative suffix marked by the vowel nasalization and final h). The use of h-grade to indicate sequence (in addition to the switch-reference marker -ok) can be seen below:

With the sequence h-grade, the last verb in the sequence takes on temporal and aspectual affixes, while the preceding verbs take on the h-grade and the appropriate switch-reference marker.

N-grade
In Koasati, the n-grade is relatively uncommon but is used to add emphasis, roughly meaning "completely" or "to continue" depending on whether the verb used is a verb of state or description or a verb of action. To form the n-grade, the vowel of the verb root's penultimate syllable is nasalized and accented. For example:

Reduplication
Koasati has both punctual and iterative reduplication for verbs, in which part of the root is repeated to indicate that an action is repeated. With punctual reduplication, the verb's initial consonant and vowel (or consonant and o if no vowel is present) are copied and inserted before the final syllable of the root.  For example, míslin "to blink" becomes mismíhlin "to flutter the eyelids". With iterative reduplication, the consonant and vowel of the penultimate syllable of the root are copied and inserted before the final syllable of the root. For example, molápkan "to gleam" becomes molalápkan "to flash". The iterative can also be formed using the Position 6 iterative prefixes ohoh- and hoho-.

The glottal stop
The glottal stop [ʔ] is used to form the interrogative by infixing [ʔ] before a verb's penultimate syllable. Doing so replaces preceding vowel length (if present) and adds a high pitch accent to the syllables preceding and following the glottal stop. For example, /ishí:c/ "you see it" changes to the question /ishíʔcá/ "Do you see it?".

Syntax

Word order
Koasati sentences generally follow  a subject, object, verb (SOV) pattern. If an indirect object is present, the order is typically subject, indirect object, verb (SIoV). For sentences with both a direct and indirect object, the order is typically subject, object, verb, indirect object (SOVIo), though SIoOV also occurs. Any locatives tend to follow the verb. Because Koasati uses the nominative case, these orders are not rigid - elements can be moved within the sentence for emphasis. Examples of some basic orders follow:

SOV

SOVIo

Case marking
Koasati is an active–stative language. It has seven cases that can be used across five classes of nouns:

The five noun classes contain the following types of nouns, followed by examples:
Class I: nouns for animate objects (ifá, "dog")
Class II: nouns to or in which action can occur (óːla, "town")
Class III: nouns within or among which action can occur (íːsa, "house")
Class IV: nouns describing an area where action can occur (caffá, "field")
Class V: personal names, kinship terms (awó, "grandfather")

Switch-reference
Koasati has switch-reference marking, in which suffixes indicate whether the subjects of two verbs are co-referent. The suffix –k indicates that the subject of the verb that follows is the same as that of the previous verb, while –n indicates that the subject is different than that of the previous verb. The suffixes –ok and –on can also be used in the same way for extra emphasis or "focus". The switch-reference marker –p indicates the introduction of a new topic. An example of each suffix follows:
nó:ra-k ɫabósli-h bánna-k hí:ca-t á:ta-toho-:li-k akkámmi-tik labósl-á:ha-k sam, kí,:c-o-t — "Nora tried to extinguish it, and she kept on watching it, but this being so, she was unable to extinguish it."
athómma-k yomáhli-n calakkí ho-ká:ha-hco-k — "They called the wandering Indians Cherokees."
skólka im-alo, kí, st-o-n mí:ta-k im-alósti-tika-p — "They were not interested in school; however, others were interested in it."

Notes

References

External links 

 Sovereign Nation of The Coushatta Tribe of Louisiana
 Koasati (Coushatta) Language Project
 How to count in Koasati

Agglutinative languages
Koasati
Muskogean languages
Subject–object–verb languages
Indigenous languages of the North American Southeast
Indigenous languages of Oklahoma
Indigenous languages of Texas
Endangered languages of the United States
Endangered indigenous languages of the Americas